Doofus is an American alternative comic book character created by Rick Altergott. In the low-brow, scatological strip, Doofus and his sidekick/pal Henry Hotchkiss are two foolish creeps who have adventures in the fictional Flowertown, USA. Fantagraphics Books published two issues of the series from 1994 to 1997.

Characterization 
Doofus is a short, obese grown man with facial stubble and a pageboy haircut, topped by a straw boater. He is a known liar and obnoxious human being, with an affinity for sniffing women's underwear.

Publication history 
Doofus strips first appeared in the alternative weekly The Stranger.  Doofus's comic book debut was in Eightball #8 (Fantagraphics, May 1992). From 1995 to 1998, Doofus strips appeared as a backup feature in Peter Bagge's Hate, issues #21–26, and #29–30. The character also appeared in various publications, including Heavy Metal, and other comic books published by Fantagraphics, including Raisin Pie.

In 2014, Altergott produced a weekly Doofus-related comic for Vice titled Flowertown USA.

List of appearances 
 Eightball #8 (Fantagraphics Books, May 1992)
 Heavy Metal vol. 17, #4 (Metal Mammoth Inc., September 1993)
 Doofus #1 (Fantagraphics, December 1994)
 Hate #21 (Fantagraphics, December 1995)
 Hate #22 (Fantagraphics, March 1996)
 Hate #23 (Fantagraphics, June 1996)
 Hate #24 (Fantagraphics, August 1996) — featuring Stink Hair Stu
 Hate #25 (Fantagraphics, December 1996)
 Hate #26 (Fantagraphics, March 1997)
 Doofus #2 (Fantagraphics, Spring 1997)
 Hate #29 (Fantagraphics, January 1998)
 Hate #30 (Fantagraphics, May 1998)
 Doofus Omnibus (Fantagraphics, October 2002)
  Raisin Pie #1 (Fantagraphics, October 2002)
 Legal Action Comics #2 (Dirty Danny Legal Defense Fund, 2003)
 Kramers Ergot #7 (Buenaventura Press, 2008) — featuring Stink Hair Stu
 Raisin Pie #2 (Fantagraphics, July 2003)
 Raisin Pie #3 (Fantagraphics, Spring 2004)
 Raisin Pie #4 (Fantagraphics, September 2005)
 Raisin Pie #5 (Fantagraphics, July 2007)
 Vice (2014) — weekly series

References

Notes

Sources consulted 
 Altergott, Rick. Doofus Omnibus. Fantagraphics, Seattle, Wash.. 2002

External links 
Doofus comic strips on creator Altergott's website
 
 

1994 comics debuts
American comics characters
American comic strips
Comics characters introduced in 1992
Fantagraphics titles
Male characters in comics
Comics set in the United States